Murray Kinnell (24 July 1889 – 11 August 1954) was a British-born American actor, recognized for playing smooth, gentlemanly, although rather shady characters. He began acting on the English stage in 1907, toured in the United States from 1912 through 1914, then returned to England where he served in the British Army during World War I. After the war, he emigrated to the US. He appeared in 71 films between the pre-code era of 1930 and 1937. He later served the Screen Actors Guild in several positions for 16 years.

Early Years
Kinnell was born in Sydenham, London when it was still part of Kent. He was the second of three sons to John Kinnell, a Scottish-born engineer, and Rose Taylor from Surrey. He was educated first at Seaford College in Sussex, then at Mill Hill School in London.

Early stage career
According to a later interview, Kinnell began his stage career in the troupe of Florence Glossop-Harris in 1907. His first known stage credits are from 1909 with the company of Allan Wilkie. By 1911 he had joined the company of Frank Cellier, the husband of Florence Glossop-Harris. Kinnell played in both Hamlet and The Merchant of Venice on English stages, and undoubtedly many other plays as well for which verification is lacking.

Kinnell next appears in 1912 with a touring company playing Pomander Walk in the US and Canada. The following year he joined the Annie Russell Old English Comedy Company, playing throughout the eastern US in She Stoops to Conquer, The Rivals, and The School for Scandal. The tour wound up its run in Philadelphia during April 1914. Kinnell used the time off to marry the tour's ingenue, Henrietta Goodwin. 

Edward Sheldon's The Garden of Paradise, produced by Liebler & Company, opened in late November 1914 at the Park Theatre in Manhattan. Kinnell played two roles in this visual extravaganza based on Hans Christian Andersen's The Little Mermaid. However the production bankrupted Liebler & Company, and the receiver shut the play down on December 8, 1914 after a little more than two weeks.

Kinnell then returned to England, where he performed Shakespeare with the F. R. Benson company from late 1915 thru early April 1916.

Military service and post-war stage
Kinnell had enlisted in the London Scottish during January 1916, but wasn't taken up for training until April of that year. He was a lieutenant with the 2/14th Battalion that saw action in France, Salonika, and Palestine as part of the 60th Division. He served for three years, until 1919, when he resumed his acting career upon discharge at the war's end.

Following military service, Kinnell next appeared in a production of The Merchant of Venice at the Court Theatre in London that ran from October 1919 through February 1920. Beginning in January 1920 he also did single performances in other plays for the experimental Stage Society and the revivalist Phoenix Society. 

Later that year Kinnell joined the St. James Theater company in the English debut of The Jest, a three-month tour that also included his wife in the cast. However, by January 1921, Kinnell was "at liberty", according to his theatrical card in The Daily Telegraph. While his wife returned to America for a role in a Broadway production, Kinnell joined the Henry Baynton company and performed a large reperatoire of drastically pruned Shakespeare from June 1921 thru November 1922. It played well in the more provincial towns but London critics were quite severe over the cuts. Kinnell then did an original play Oliver Cromwell, written and produced by John Drinkwater and starring Henry Ainley.

Transatlantic commuter
E. H. Sothern and his wife Julia Marlowe brought four English actors to the US in September 1923 for their final Shakespeare tour, one of which was Kinnell. The tour opened with Cymbeline on October 2, 1923 at the Jolson Theatre. Unfortunately, Marlowe was both past her prime and wedded to an outdated style of acting that drew harsh criticism. It cannot have been an easy experience for Kinnell, but he perservered with the company's repertoire of Shakespeare plays both in New York and on tour. In March 1924 Kinnell left the still-going tour for a debut drama based on the book Simon Called Peter. 

Kinnell returned to England where he next performed during July 1924 in an original work by Joshua Jordan called The Dream Kiss, described as "a farce of somnambulism". It hardly seemed worth the trip, for he was next cast during September 1924 in the Broadway production of Hassan, based on the verses of James Elroy Flecker. This spectacle dispensed with tryouts due to its massive scale (some 200 performers including 60 principals and 70 dancers), perhaps relying on the success the production had in London the previous year. Despite incidental music by Frederick Delius the show closed after just 16 performances, with only Kinnell drawing praise among the cast. February 1925 saw him in a revival of William Congreve's The Way of the World.

Old English
For the first time Kinnell became the leading man of an acting troupe in March 1925, with the All-English stock company at the Orpheum in Montreal. This was under the direction of Leo G. Carroll, with Betty Murray as the female lead. His tenure with the company lasted thru May 1925. While Kinnell was in Canada, his wife Henrietta Goodwin had a small part in Old English on Broadway, a play by John Galsworthy that starred George Arliss. When it went on tour in the fall of 1925, Kinnell joined his wife in the road company, albeit as a leading actor. This was Kinnell's first role as an outright villain, a "blackmailing solicitor" who hounds the eponymous character (himself a scoundrel) played by Arliss. The part gained him his first published interview, and several years later his first film role.

The Old English tour took a four-month hiatus in late May 1926, while Arliss vacationed in England. Kinnell's time off was spent performing in The Lovers with the Phoenix Players in summer 1926.  Arliss returned from England in September 1926, and the Old English tour resumed playing, reaching Los Angeles in December 1926, then winding up the long tour at Philadelphia during May 1927.

Arliss again
A touring production of The Constant Wife was Kinnell's next performance. It starred Ethel Barrymore and C. Aubrey Smith, with Kinnell in a supporting role. It opened in late September 1927 and finished up six weeks later.

Arliss kept Kinnell with him on his next major engagement, playing Bassiano to Arliss' Shylock in The Merchant of Venice, with Peggy Wood as Portia. The Winthrop Ames production had a week-long tryout at New Haven, Connecticut, before premiering on Broadway. Brooks Atkinson pronounced it as workmanlike but without spirit, and thought Arliss had turned Shylock into a gentleman. The production closed on Broadway after eight weeks, and immediately began touring the East Coast. The tour closed in May 1928 and Kinnell joined the Scarborough Stock Company for a six-week season starting in late June.

The first Edgar Wallace play produced in the US was The Sign of the Leopard, which had been called The Squeaker in the UK. Kinnell had a leading role in this, starting with tryouts in Brooklyn and Philadelphia, before going to Broadway in December 1928. Described as a crime play or a melodrama, it failed to impress New York critics. After it closed, Kinnell took over the male lead in the touring company for the Broadway production of Young Love that starred Dorothy Gish.

Kinnell's first-known radio performance came in July 1929 with an NBC broadcast of The Importance of Being Earnest. His next known acting credit did not occur until late February 1930, when he appeared in a tryout for Elizabeth and Essex by Harry Wagstaff Gribble. This compilation of incidents from three centuries-old plays starred Thais Lawton and Hugh Buckler in the title roles. Renamed to The Royal Virgin on Broadway, The New York Times found it competant but dull, saying: "...the best performing of the play was Murray Kinnell's crafty, serpentine portrayal of Cecil".

Screen career

First films: 1930-31
Warner Brothers (WB) had signed George Arliss to make films of his most famous stage performances; Old English would be the third movie. Both Kinnell and his wife Henrietta Goodwin reprised their stage roles for the cameras in Old English, the first film for each, though only Kinnell was credited. 

Kinnell told an interviewer after completing his first film that he much preferred it to stage acting. However, he went on the stage in Los Angeles, playing the lead in The Infinite Shoeblack during November 1930 to acclaim from local reviewers. The following month, his second film, The Princess and the Plumber, opened in Los Angeles.

By February 1931 he was mentioned as cast as Metz for The Secret Six. April 1931 saw the release of both that film and The Public Enemy, in which Kinnell played the two-timing petty-larceny hood Putty Nose. The latter earned Kinnell praise from the drama critic of The Los Angeles Times: "Murray Kinnell, in his few appearances on the screen, gains a place for himself among the best character actors in Hollywood".

The following month he left Los Angeles for Honolulu for filming The Black Camel. His derelict artist turned beachcomber, shown openly living with a Hawaiian woman, was the most interesting character in that early Charlie Chan film, released in July 1931.

After playing three well-received and memorable roles in the first six months of 1931, the remaining movies Kinnel did that year provided him far less attention and enthusiasm from reviewers.

Prolific years: 1932-34
During the next three years Kinnell would average a dozen films annually, though some had him in small uncredited parts. His first film released in 1932 was The Menace. As an actor, he was most impressed with the potential of a young unknown actress in that film. Knowing that George Arliss was looking for a leading woman in his next picture, Kinnell suggested to Arliss that Bette Davis be cast in The Man Who Played God. Davis, who at the time was getting discouraged with her career, never forgot Kinnell's help: "If it hadn't been for Murray Kinnell's belief in me, I probably would have bade goodbye to Hollywood forever".

April 1932 saw the release of Grand Hotel, an instant success with the critics. Kinnell's small feature bit didn't even merit a mention by reviewers in this ensemble effort with seven major stars. That same month The Mouthpiece was released, another film in which Kinnell had a bit part as a butler.

Kinnell did another George Arliss film called A Successful Calamity in September 1932.

A film that Kinnell made in 1933 would take years before being allowed in some theaters. Damaged Lives was a docudrama about venereal disease; Kinnell and Jason Robards played doctors that help afflicted patients.

Arliss, who had left Warners for the new 20th Century Fox studio, cast Kinnell as one of the brothers in The House of Rothschild, released in March 1934. Kinnell also did two more Charlie Chan films that year: Charlie Chan's Courage, in which he was the first victim, and Charlie Chan in London, where he played a seemingly sinister butler with an unexpected secret.

He finished 1934 with the December release of Anne of Green Gables.

Later films: 1935-37
Kinnell's film year of 1935 began with a role as a "dasteredly plotter" in Charlie Chan in Paris. He then began filming another historical picture starring George Arliss, Cardinal Richelieu. 

Hoping to repeat the success of The House of Rothschild, 20th Century Fox mounted another historical tale around an English company in Lloyd's of London, released in November 1936. Kinnell played Rev. Nelson, the father of Lord Nelson, in a film that one reviewer said "lacks the powerful punch which the first conveyed".

Kinnell's last two films were an uncredited bit in Parnell, and a major part in the Grade B mystery, Think Fast, Mr. Moto, both released in summer 1937.

Screen Actors Guild
Though he wasn't a pioneering member of the Screen Actors Guild (SAG), Kinnell joined that trade union within a few years of its founding. By August 1936 he had been elected assistant treasurer. He was business chairman for the annual SAG fundraising society ball, and he handled issuing temporary credentials for journalists visiting movie lots. 

SAG officials appointed him in 1939 to be the Guild's representative for arbitration hearings with the Motion Picture Producers (MPP) over contract disputes. Besides arbitration, he also worked with the producers on limiting the numbers of screen extras handled by Central Casting to favor those with most experience. 

During 1943 Kinnell was again appointed as arbitrator in a dispute involving a pay hike demanded by SAG for over 5000 extras, stand-ins, stuntmen, body doubles, and singers. During April 1944 he testified in a National Labor Relations Board hearing that for screen extras there were "too many people competing for too little work and all could not hope to make a living at that type of work".

By 1949 Kinnell was the agency administrator for SAG, responsible for relations between independent screen actors outside the studio system and the talent agencies that represented them. Kinnell oversaw the negotiations for a ten-year agreement between SAG and talent management that would control the terms under which actors could be signed.

Later years
Kinnell retired from SAG on February 28, 1952. He told SAG officials he was going to take his wife on a long trip abroad, but would be available to the organization on an advisory basis when he returned. 

On 11 August 1954, Kinnell died at his home in Santa Barbara, California.

Personal life
Kinnell's 1928 Petition for Naturalization listed his description at age 39 as 5' 9 1/2" (176.5 cm) tall, weighing 145 pounds (65.8 kg), with gray eyes and brown hair. After completing the five-year mandatory residency, Kinnell's US citizenship was approved in 1933.

Kinnell married Henrietta Goodwin in Philadelphia on April 14, 1914. She was a stage actress, born in Tacoma, Washington, but raised in the Washington, D.C. area. They had one son, Peter Kinnell, who was born in June 1916 while they resided in the UK. He did not join his parents in America until August 1925.

According to newspaper accounts, Kinnell habitually wore a monocle in private life, and once told an interviewer "I became an actor because I didn't know any better". He was an excellent amateur fencer, and an active member of the Hollywood Cricket Club. Kinnell and his son Peter were part of the traveling Hollywood team that took on and beat a Vancouver eleven at a Cricket Jubilee in British Columbia. 

He was also a chess player; in the aftermath of World War II he and other British ex-pat veterans in Hollywood would visit Birmingham Hospital regularly to play disabled US veterans.

Stage performances
The table is by year of first performance. His performances from 1907, 1908, and 1910 lack documention as yet, and other early years are incomplete.

Filmography

Notes

References

External links

1889 births
1954 deaths
English male film actors
20th-century English male actors
British emigrants to the United States
Burials at Santa Barbara Cemetery